Riot is a 1969 American drama film produced by William Castle, directed by Buzz Kulik and starring Gene Hackman and Jim Brown.

Plot
While the warden (real-life warden Frank A. Eyman) of a state prison is away, the isolation block erupts and 35 of the most violent criminals (led by Gene Hackman) stage a riot and take over their portion of the prison. Cully Briston (Jim Brown), in for five years and awaiting his eventual parole, wants no part of the riot. He impulsively gets involved, defending a prison guard and protecting him from the maniacs in the block.

Cast

Production
The film is based on a non-fiction novel by Frank Elli, which chronicled an actual riot that took place in an Arizona prison.

In addition to using real-life warden Frank A. Eyman, the production utilized a number of real-life prisoners as extras.

The film was partially shot at the Yuma Territorial Prison.

Release
The film was given a theatrical release in the United States by Paramount Pictures in 1969.

The film was given a belated release on VHS by Paramount Home Video in 1993.

The film was sub-licensed to Olive Films by Paramount and released on DVD by in 2010.

See also
 List of American films of 1969

References

Reviews
 Prison Movies review

External links

 
 

1969 films
1969 drama films
1960s prison films
American prison drama films
Films directed by Buzz Kulik
Films scored by Krzysztof Komeda
Films with screenplays by James Poe
Paramount Pictures films
1960s English-language films
1960s American films